School District 118 may refer to:
 Belleville School District 118
 Danville School District No. 118
 Palos School District 118
 Wauconda School District 118